HMYOI Werrington (also known as Werrington Juvenile Centre) is a male juveniles' prison located in the village of Werrington in Staffordshire, England. The prison is operated by His Majesty's Prison Service.

History
Werrington opened in 1895 as an industrial school. Prison Commissioners purchased the establishment in 1955, and converted it into a Senior Detention Centre in 1957. Werrington then became a Youth Custody Centre in 1985, after implementation of the Criminal Justice Act 1982. In 1988 it was converted into a Juvenile Prison, its current role.

In September 1998, an inspection report from His Majesty's Chief Inspector of Prisons criticised Werrington for being unsuitable for 15 to 17-year-old inmates, stating that conditions at the prison were akin those in adult jails. The report criticised the prison for converting its dormitory-style accommodation into double-occupancy cells, and for prisoners having their meals in their cells rather than using the communal dining rooms. Inadequate medical cover for some prisoners, and the sports hall's poor facilities were also highlighted.

In March 2003, the Prison Reform Trust highlighted Werrington Prison for its high turnover of governors. The trust noted that Werrington had employed four governors in five years, and that such arrangements would not be allowed in schools or hospitals. The trust also singled out the high levels of prison officers' sickness at the jail.

In September 2007, the Howard League for Penal Reform claimed that inmates at Werrington were being forcibly strip searched. It was reported that on one occasion, a prisoner had his clothing cut off whilst undergoing a search. However the league noted that the prison had improved in other areas.

The prison today
Werrington Prison is a Juvenile Centre for males aged from 15 to 18. Full-time and part-time education courses are provided as part of the prison's regime, as are vocational training workshops in Creative Design, Music and Radio, Barista, Catering, Painting and Decorating, Tiling , Plastering, Barbering, Sports Studies, ICT, Restart Dog Project and Uniformed Services.

The young people also have regular sessions delivered by Kinetic youth workers.

Physical education is offered to inmates throughout the week, evenings and weekends. 

The prison provides regular "Enrichment Days" on which a range of visitors deliver talks and workshops in their specialist areas of expertise.

The prison's enrichment programme also includes First Aid, Origami and Parenting.

2019 Inspection

An inspection report published in June 2019 found "many positives".

References

External links
 Ministry of Justice pages on Werrington

Werrington
Werrington
1957 establishments in England